Johan Rudolf Kjellén (13 June 1864, in Torsö – 14 November 1922, in Uppsala) was a Swedish political scientist, geographer and politician who first coined the term "geopolitics". His work was influenced by Friedrich Ratzel. Along with Alexander von Humboldt, Carl Ritter, and Ratzel, Kjellén would lay the foundations for the German Geopolitik that would later be espoused prominently by General Karl Haushofer.

Kjellén completed gymnasium in Skara in 1880 and matriculated at Uppsala University the same year. He completed his PhD in Uppsala in 1891 and was a docent there from 1890 to 1893. He also taught at Gothenburg University from 1891 and was professor of political sciences and statistics there from 1901 until he received the prestigious Skyttean professorship of Eloquence and Government in Uppsala in 1916.

A conservative politician, he was a member of the Second Chamber of the Parliament of Sweden from 1905 to 1908 and of its First Chamber from 1911 to 1917.

Ideas

Kjellén was Ratzel's student and would further elaborate on organic state theory, coining the term "geopolitics" in the process. He was also influenced by John Robert Seeley and Heinrich von Treitschke, who were advocates of imperialism.

The basics of his ideas were presented in 1900 in the book Introduction to Sweden's Geography (based on lectures at Gothenburg University). Kjellén's book Staten som lifsform, published in 1916, is generally regarded as his most important book on the theory of the state. According to the historian and political scientist Peter Davidsen, the book asserts that states consist of five elements that should be studied by five political-scientific disciplines:

 The state as a realm or territory should be studied by geopolitics (pp. 39–75).
 The state as a people should be studied by demopolitics (pp. 76–124).
 The state as an economy should be studied by eco-politics (pp. 125–137).
 The state as a society should be studied by sociopolitics (pp. 137–147).
 The state as a government should be studied by crato-politics (pp. 147–160).

Kjellén disputed the solely legalistic characterization of states and argued that state and society are not opposites but a synthesis of the two elements. The state has a responsibility for law and order but also for social welfare/progress, and economic welfare/progress.

Autarky for Kjellén was a solution to a political problem, not an economic policy in itself. Dependence on imports meant that a country was not economically self-sufficient.

Influence
General Karl Haushofer, who would adopt many of Kjellén's ideas, was not interested in economic policy but would advocate autarky as well; a nation constantly in struggle would demand self-sufficiency.

Kjellén also (but after Maurice Barrès and numerous "national socialist" parties such as the Czech National Social Party) was an early user of the term "national socialism" in 1910. His terminology took form in the Swedish postwar welfare state, Folkhemmet, a term that he coined, which was largely inspired by the social reform-minded conservatism of Otto von Bismarck's Germany.

Geopolitics was revived in the United States by Zbigniew Brzezinski, Henry Kissinger, and Robert Kaplan.

See also
Biopolitics

References

Sources
Dorpalen, Andreas.  The World of General Haushofer.  Farrar & Rinehart, Inc., New York: 1984.
Kjellén, Rudolf, Die Grossmaechte der Gegenwart. Leipzig, Berlin, 1914.
Kjellén, Rudolf, Die politische Probleme des Weltkrieges. Leipzig, 1916.
Kjellén, Rudolf, Staten som lifsform. Stockholm, 1916.
Kjellén, Rudolf, Der Staat als Lebensform. Leipzig, 1917.
Kjellén, Rudolf, Die Grossmaechte vor und nach dem Weltkriege. Leipzig, Berlin, 1930.
Mattern, Johannes.  Geopolitik: Doctrine of National Self-Sufficiency and Empire.  The Johns Hopkins Press, Baltimore: 1942.
Tunander, Ola. 'Swedish-German Geopolitics for a New Century – Rudolf Kjellén's ‘The State as a Living Organism’, Review of International Studies, vol. 27, no. 3, 2001.

Further reading

External links
 

1864 births
1922 deaths
Geopoliticians
Swedish political scientists
Uppsala University alumni
Academic staff of the University of Gothenburg
Members of the Första kammaren
Members of the Andra kammaren
Burials at Uppsala old cemetery